James Musto (October 12, 1899 – May 2, 1971) was a former Democratic member of the Pennsylvania House of Representatives.

Family
His son was Ray Musto who also served in the Pennsylvania House of Representatives and later in the United States House of Representatives.

References

1899 births
1971 deaths
People from Pittston, Pennsylvania
Democratic Party members of the Pennsylvania House of Representatives
20th-century American politicians